Blake Freeland (born May 3, 2000) is an American football offensive tackle for the BYU Cougars.

Career
Freeland was born in Herriman, Utah. He played football at Herriman High School, where he played quarterback his junior year and tight end and defensive end as a senior. Freeland then attended Brigham Young University, where he played college football for the Cougars from 2019 to 2022.

Professional career
Freeland holds an NFL Combine record for an offensive lineman with a 37" vertical jump.

Personal life
Freeland's father, Jim, played linebacker at BYU in the 1990s.

References

External links
BYU Cougars bio

Living people

2000 births
American football offensive tackles
Players of American football from Utah
BYU Cougars football players
People from Herriman, Utah